Andrew Witts (born 22 August 1961) is a former Australian rules footballer who played with Collingwood in the Victorian Football League (VFL).

Witts, who came from amateur club Old Melburnians, was already 23 when he played his only season at Collingwood in 1985. He debuted against Essendon in round 15 and remained in the team until round 21, for a total of seven games. His guernsey number, 65, was the highest ever regular number worn by a player in VFL/AFL history.

If one-off numbers are considered, Geelong player Harry Taylor wore 85 after the unlikely scenario of being sent off with a blood rule twice in the same game and therefore not having a second spare guernsey; it is still unclear why there was an 85 guernsey available.

Subsequently, the number 67 was worn by ten  Indigenous players to celebrate the 50th anniversary of the 1967 referendum during the Sir Doug Nicholls Round in 2017.

References

1961 births
Australian rules footballers from Victoria (Australia)
Collingwood Football Club players
Old Melburnians Football Club players
Living people